Jagjit Singh (born Jagmohan Singh Dhiman; 8 February 1941 – 10 October 2011) was an Indian composer, singer and musician. He composed and sang in numerous languages and is credited for the revival and popularity of ghazal, an Indian classical art form, by choosing poetry that was relevant to the masses and composing them in a way that laid more emphasis on the meaning of words and melody evoked by them. In terms of Indian classical music, his style of composing and gayaki (singing) is considered as Bol-pradhan, one that lays emphasis on words. He highlighted this in his music for films such as Prem Geet (1981), Arth (1982), and Saath Saath (1982), and TV serials Mirza Ghalib (1988) and Kahkashan (1991). Singh is considered to be the most successful ghazal singer and composer of all time in terms of critical acclaim and commercial success. With a career spanning five decades and many albums, the range and breadth of his work has been regarded as genre-defining.

Singh's 1987 album, Beyond Time, was the first digitally recorded release in India. He was regarded as one of India's most influential artists. With sitar player Ravi Shankar and other leading figures of Indian classical music and literature, Singh voiced his concerns over politicisation of arts and culture in India and lack of support experienced by the practitioners of India's traditional art forms, particularly folk artists and musicians. He lent active support to several philanthropic endeavours such as the library at St. Mary's School, Mumbai, Bombay Hospital, CRY, Save the Children and ALMA.

Singh was awarded the Padma Bhushan by the government of India in 2003 and in February 2014, the government released a set of two postal stamps in his honour.

Early life and career

Jagjit Singh Dhiman was born at Sri Ganganagar, Rajasthan, India (then Bikaner State). His father, Sardar Amar Singh Dhiman, was a surveyor with the government's Public Works' Department and hailed from village Dalla in Ropar district of Punjab.

Educated initially at Khalsa High School and Government College in Sri Ganganagar, Singh obtained an arts degree from DAV College, Jalandhar. There, he began his professional career in 1961 by undertaking singing and composing assignments at All India Radio's (AIR) Jalandhar station. Later, he studied to obtain a post-graduate degree in history from Kurukshetra University in Haryana. Throughout this time, and as a consequence of a natural talent that was spotted by his father, Singh learned music initially from a visually impaired master of Indian classical music, Pandit Chagan Lal Sharma and later from Ustad Jamal Khan of Maihar gharana, who taught and trained him in all the prominent styles of Hindustani Classical vocal tradition such as Khayal, Dhrupad, Thumri and others. Throughout his teenage years, he performed on stage and composed music. Although his father, who was a government employee, had hoped that he would become an engineer, Singh pursued his passion for music relentlessly. Like all parents in Indian middle-class families, his father aspired for him to become a bureaucrat. However, he also encouraged Singh and his siblings to learn music.

In March 1965, and without the knowledge of his family, Singh moved to Bombay, where there were many opportunities for music artists because of the Hindi film industry. He obtained work initially as a singer of advertising jingles and later progressed to playback singing.

Achievement

Singh was still struggling to make a living in 1967 when he met the Bengali-born Chitra Dutta. She divorced her husband and married Singh in December 1969. Following the birth of their son, Vivek, the couple performed as a singing duo but it was not until the 1977 release of the album The Unforgettable that they found significant, and surprising, success. In the interval, the primary difficulty for them had been that the ghazal music genre was dominated by Muslim artists and especially those from Pakistan.

The Unforgettable, which was the couple's first LP, was an unconventional recording and it turned them into stars. The song "Baat Niklegi" from the album achieved great popularity for the Singhs. The Independent described it in 2011 as "ground-breaking ... it became a transformative, before-and-after milestone in the history of Indian popular and ghazals music. It remains that." Using modern arrangements, it consists of ten tracks that include two on which they sang as a duo and the remainder equally split between Jagjit and Chitra singing the lead. The Independent further noted that "This format of solo and duet performances from the first commercially successful husband-and-wife team in Indian popular music proved astonishingly successful." Jagjit explained that "I was determined to polish up the genre and make it more acceptable to modern tastes, so chose simple poems and set them to simple tunes. I also introduced western instrumentation to make them livelier." Thereafter, the couple worked both on solo and joint musical projects and performed concerts worldwide. There was success from involvement with the film industry and they amassed considerable wealth,.

Among their subsequent duo recordings of the 1970s were Shiv Kumar Batalvi – Birha da Sultan (1978), Live in Concert at Wembley (1979) and Come Alive (1979). Of those released in the 1980s, "The Latest" by Sudarshan Faakir was the best selling album with his lifetime hit "Woh Kagaz ki Kashti...Woh Baarish ka Paani". It was the first album by the duo with poetry of only one Poet. Ecstasies (1984) has also been described as "one of their finest". The joint projects ceased in 1990 when their 20-year-old son, Vivek, died in a road accident. Chitra felt unable to sing following these events. Monica, Chitra's daughter from her first marriage, committed suicide in 2009.

Although Jagjit continued to work and to have success after Chitra withdrew from public life he, too, was affected by the death of Vivek. The Guardian notes that he "suffered from deep depression and his anguish was often evident in his live performances." Aside from occupying himself with solo projects, which he performed in several languages, he collaborated with Lata Mangeshkar on an album titled Sajda, an Urdu word meaning "prostration".

Singh's work in film encompassed playback singing for productions such as Arth, Saath Saath and Premgeet. He composed all of the songs for the latter, as well as for the TV serial Mirza Ghalib that was based on the life of the eponymous poet, Mirza Ghalib.

On 10 May 2007, in the presence of numerous political and diplomatic luminaries at an event held in the Central Hall of the Parliament of India, Jagjit Singh rendered Bahadur Shah Zafar's famous ghazal Lagta nahin hai dil mera to commemorate the 150th anniversary of the Indian Rebellion of 1857.

Albums

Personal life
In 1990, Vivek Singh (Jagjit Singh and Chitra's son) died in a road accident at the age of 20. This came as a profound shock to Jagjit and Chitra Singh. They gave up music for a full year after the death. At the end of that period, Jagjit returned slowly to music, but Chitra announced her retirement and declared that she would not sing or record any more songs.

Singh had suffered from numerous ailments like diabetes and hypertension during his later life, and had undergone two heart bypass surgeries in 1998 and 2007. A chain smoker for decades, he had stopped smoking after his first heart attack.

Death
Singh turned 70 in February 2011. To celebrate his 70th birthday he committed 70 concerts in different parts of the world. He toured the UK, Singapore, Mauritius, inter alias, in 2011 and was due to perform with Ghulam Ali in Mumbai but suffered a brain haemorrhage on 23 September 2011. He was in coma for over two weeks and died on 10 October at Lilavati Hospital, in Mumbai. He was cremated the following day at Chandanwadi Crematorium near Marine Lines in Mumbai.

A number of tributes have been paid to Singh after his death, and some tried to cash in on his popularity, which was criticised by his wife.

Legacy
A biography of Singh, entitled Beyond Time based on about 40 hours of interviews with him, was released in 2012. It was transcribed and edited by Ashrani Mathur.
A biopic documentary by the name of Kaagaz Ki Kashti has been made on the life journey of Jagjit Singh, who broke through the norms and revolutionised the Ghazal scenario. The film traces the struggle and stardom in his musical career, the love & loss in his personal life and the scope and limitations in the music scenario of the times. The film directed by Brahmanand S Singh is currently available on Amazon Prime Video in India and worldwide.

Recognition
 In 2012, State Government of Rajasthan posthumously awarded Jagjit Singh its highest civilian award, the Rajasthan Ratna.
 In 2002 and 2005, Singh was awarded the Indian Telly Award for the best title singer for a TV show.
 In 2003, Singh was awarded the Padma Bhushan, India's third highest civilian award, by the government of India
 In 1998, Jagjit Singh was awarded Sahitya Academy Award, a literary honour in India. He was awarded for popularising the work of Mirza Ghalib.
 Sahitya Kala Academy Award by Rajasthan government in 1998
 Ghalib Academy by Delhi Government in 2005
 Dayawati Modi Award in 1999.
 Lata Mangeshkar Samman in 1998 by Madhya Pradesh government.
 D.Litt. by Kurukshetra University, Haryana in 2003
 Teacher's Lifetime Achievement Award in 2006.8th Teacher's Achievement Awards.
 Google honoured Jagjit Singh with a doodle on his 72nd birthday on 8 February 2013.

Film scores

Discography

 Arth (1982)
 Saath Saath (1982)
 Aaeena (2000)
 Aarogya Mantra (2008)
 Adaa (1992)
 Ae Mere Dil (1983)
 A Journey (2000)
 Akhand Ram Naam (2009)
 A Milestone (1980)
 Amritanjali (2009)
 An Evening With Jagjit & Chitra Singh (Live)
 A Sound Affair (1985)
 Awaaz (2007)
 Baba Sheikh Farid (Shabads & Shlokas- 2006)
 Beyond Time (1987)
 Best of Jagjit & Chitra Singh (2005)
 Bhajans (Lata-Jagjit −2004)
 Bhajan Uphar (2008)
 Biraha Da Sultan (1978)
 Chahat (2004)
 Chirag (Also known as Live in Trinidad – Islamic Devotional- 1993)
 Classics Forever (2000)
 Close to My Heart (2003)
 Come Alive in a Concert (1979)
 Cry For CRY (1995)
 Dard-E-Jigar (2011)
 Desires (1994)
 Different Strokes (2001)
 Dil- Jagjit, Asha & Lata (2002)
 Dil Kahin Hosh Kahin (1999)
 Do Dil Do Rahein (A Tribute To Mehdi Hasan- 2007)
 Echoes (1986)
 Ecstasies (1984)
 Emotions (1989)
 Encore
 Essential Chants of Shiva (2006)
 Eternity (1978)
 Face To Face (1994)
 Forever (2002)
 Forget Me Not (2002)
 Gayatri Mantra (2008)
 Ghalib Live in Concert (2014)
 Ghazal Greats Jagjit Singh And Ghulam Ali
 Ghazals from Films (1989)
 Golden Moments (1999)
 Govardhan Girdhari (2011)
 Guru Govind Singh (1998)
 Hare Krishna (Live)
 Hari Om Tatsat (2003)
 Harmony
 Hey Govind Hey Gopal (1991)
 Hey Ram (Ram Dhun)
 Hare Ram Hare Krishna (1999)
 Hope (1991)
 Kahkashan,Doordarshan TV Serial (1991–92)
 In Search (1992)
 In Sight (1994)
 In Sync- Jagjit Singh & Asha Bhonsle
 Inteha (2009)
 Jaam Utha(1999)
 Jai Raghunandan Jai Siyaram (2002)
 Jai Siya Ram (2000)
 Jazbaat (2008)
 Jeevan Kya Hai (2005)
 Jeevan Maran Chhe Ek (Gujrati)
 Kabir (2007)
 Karuna (2007)
 Keertan (Gurbani- 2000)
 Khamoshi (2002)
 Khumar
 Khwahish (2002)
 Krishna (1983)
 Krishna Bhajans (1998)
 Koi Baat Chale (2006)
 Krishna Bhajans And Music For Divine Meditation (2009)
 Krishna Dhun
 Live in Concert (1988)

 Live in Concert at the Wembley (1980)
 Live in Pakistan (1979)
 Live in Royal Albert Hall (1983)
 Live in Sydney (2006)
 Life Story (Live- 2001)
 Live With Jagjit & Chitra Singh
 Live With Jagjit Singh (1993)
 Love
 Love Is Blind (1998)
 Maa (1993)
 Madho Hum Aise Tu Aisa (2003)
 Madhusudana- Shree Krishna Dhun (2011)
 Magic Moments
 Main Aur Meri Tanhai (1981)
 Man Jeetey Jagjit (1990)
 Man Mein Ram Basa Le
 Marasim (1999)
 Mara Ghatma Shrinathji (2007)
 Mehfil (1990)
 Melodious Pair
 Memorable Concert (Live)
 Memorable Ghazals of Jagjit and Chitra (1990)
 Mirage (1995)
 Mirza Ghalib (T.V. Serial- 1988)
 Mitr Pyaare Nu (2005)
 Moksha (2005)
 Morning Prayers And Music For Divine Meditation (2009)
 Muntzir (2004)
 Nayi Disha (1999)
 Nivedan (2011)
 Om- The Divine Mantra (2007)
 Parwaaz (live at the Esplanade, Singapore- 2004)
 Passions (1987)
 Phaldata Ganesh: God Who Fulfills Wishes (2006)
 Playback Years
 Pray For India
 Punjabi Hits- Jagjit & Chitra Singh
 Radhey Krishna Radhey Shyam (2000)
 Radhey Krishna Dhun
 Rare Gems (1992)
 Rare Moments
 Ravayat
 Rishton Mein Darar Aayi
 Romance
 Masha alla
 Royal Salute
 Saanwara (2003)
 Saher (2000)
 Sai Dhun (2005)
 Sajda (1991)
 Samvedna (2002)
 Samyog (Nepali)
 Shabads Live in the UK (2014)
 Shiva (Dhuns and Bhajans- 2005)
 Shri Ganesha (2010)
 Shukrana (2011)
 Silsilay (1998)
 Solid Gold (2001)
 Someone Somewhere (1990)
 Soz (2001)
 Stolen Moments
 Tera Bayaan Ghalib (2012)
 The Inimitable Ghazals Composed by Jagjit Singh (1996)
 The Latest (1982)
 The Life And Times of Jagjit Singh (2011)
 The Master and His Magic (2012)
 The Unforgettables (1977)
 The Voice From Beyond (2013)
 Together
 Trishna (Bengali-2001)
 Tum Toh Nahin Ho (2005)
 Unique (1996)
 Vakratunda Mahakaya (2006)
 Visions (1992)
 Your Choice (1993)

See also 
 Ghulam Ali
 Mehdi Hassan
 Aziz Mian

References

External links

 Jagjit Singh on BBC
 

1941 births
2011 deaths
Indian male composers
Indian male ghazal singers
Indian Sikhs
Recipients of the Padma Bhushan in arts
People from Sri Ganganagar district
Punjabi people
Kurukshetra University alumni
20th-century Indian male singers
20th-century Indian singers
Indian classical composers
20th-century Indian composers
Musicians from Rajasthan
21st-century Indian male singers
21st-century Indian singers
21st-century Indian composers